Crassispira turricula, common name the turriculated pleurotoma, is a species of sea snail, a marine gastropod mollusk in the family Pseudomelatomidae.

Description
The length of the shell varies between 21 mm and 45 mm.

(Original description) The brown shell is sharply pyramidal. The upper part of the whorls is tuberculated. The tubercles are arranged in a single row. The lower part of the whorls is longitudinally ribbed, the ribs decussated. The interior of the aperture is blackish purple. The siphonal canal is short.

Distribution
This marine species occurs from Baja California, Mexico to Ecuador.

References

 G.B. Sowerby I, Proc. Zool. Soc, 1833, p. 137
 Reeve, Conch. Syst., vol. ii. pi. 233. f. 6.
 Fallon P.J. (2011) Descriptions and illustrations of some new and poorly known turrids (Gastropoda: Turridae) of the tropical northwestern Atlantic. Part 3. Genus Crassispira Swainson, 1840, subgenus Crassiclava McLean, 1971. The Nautilus 125(2): 53-62. [10 June 2011]

External links
  W.H. Dall (1909),  Report on the collection of shells from Peru ;Proceedings of the United States National Museum, Vol. 37, pages 147-294, with Plates 20—28
 
 

turricula
Gastropods described in 1834